The canton of Châtelaillon-Plage is an administrative division of the Charente-Maritime department, western France. It was created at the French canton reorganisation which came into effect in March 2015. Its seat is in Châtelaillon-Plage.

It consists of the following communes:

Angoulins
Châtelaillon-Plage
Fouras
Île-d'Aix
Saint-Laurent-de-la-Prée
Saint-Vivien
Salles-sur-Mer
Yves

References

Cantons of Charente-Maritime